N-Oxalylglycine is the organic compound with the formula HO2CC(O)NHCH2CO2H. This colourless solid is used as an inhibitor of α-ketoglutarate-dependent enzymes.  It is isosteric with α-ketoglutaric acid.  Such enzymes are pervasive and, for example, are required for the synthesis of 4-hydroxyproline.

References

Carboxamides
Dicarboxylic acids